Donald Shaw, (born 1967) is a Scottish musician, composer, producer, and one of the founding members of the group Capercaillie.  
Shaw has composed for film and TV.  In 2002, he won two Royal Television Society (RTS) awards for Best Soundtrack and Best Theme in UK television for the drama Crowdie and Cream.  His score for the film Transition (released in 2000) was BAFTA nominated for best soundtrack.  In 2004, he composed Harvest, a commission for the opening night of Celtic Connections festival.  He won the Scots Trad Music Composer of the Year award in December 2006.

Origins
Brought up in Taynuilt, Argyll, a part of the world steeped in Gaelic song and traditional music, Shaw was involved in all styles of music from an early age.  Taught the accordion by his father. Following taking lessons and receiving classical accordion training from Sylvia Wilson LBCA the two time All Britain Champion,Donald was entered into the All Britain Championship at 16 which he won.  A year later, whilst still at Oban High School, returning to his love of roots music, he co-founded Capercaillie, with whom he still writes, produces and performs.

Composing
Throughout his musical life, Shaw has been involved in composing for film and TV, most recently composing the music for the BAFTA nominated film, American Cousins.  He also scored One Last Chance, a feature film written and directed by Stewart Svaasand.  For the soundtrack of One Last Chance, Shaw recorded with Louisiana musician Dirk Powell (O Brother, Where Art Thou?) to create a score influenced by early American folk music.

In 2002, he was rewarded with two Royal Television Society awards for 'Best Soundtrack' and 'Best Theme' in UK television.  The RTS awards were for the drama, Crowdie and Cream, (co-composed with Charlie McKerron) and involved bringing over 20 musicians together from around the world, together with the BBC Scottish Symphony Orchestra.  His 70-minute score for the feature film Transition (released in 2000) was also BAFTA nominated for best soundtrack.

Producing
As well as film music, he has produced and recorded on more than 50 albums for artists in all areas of music, and collaborated with musicians including as Nanci Griffith, Peter Gabriel, Ornette Coleman, Dulce Pontes and Bonnie Raitt.  He was musical director for the BBC arts show Tacsi, in which he produced collaborations with more than 200 musicians including Tommy Smith, Martyn Bennett and the BT Ensemble. In 2000, he launched the independent label Vertical Records.

Celtic Connections
In January 2004, he composed Harvest, a commission for the opening night of the Celtic Connections festival, involving 100 musicians from all Celtic regions of Europe.  Also involved where some of the finest young traditional musicians from throughout Scotland, from the ages of 13 to 18.  Harvest was also performed at the 2006 Celtic Connections Festival.

In 2006, Shaw was appointed Artistic Director of Celtic Connections 2007.  He won the Scots Trad Music 'Composer of the Year' award in December 2006. Celtic Connections celebrated its 25th year in 2018, and Shaw announced in February 2018 that he would be stepping aside as the Artistic Director of Celtic Connections.

Discography

Appearances
Hold Your Horses — Ella Edmondson (2009)
Mark the Hard Earth - Kris Drever (2010)
Avalanche – Ímar (2018)

References

Living people
1967 births
Scottish composers
People educated at Oban High School
People from Taynuilt
Capercaillie (band) members
Vertical Records artists
Eurovision Song Contest entrants of 1996